Skeletocutis lilacina is a species of poroid fungus in the family Polyporaceae. Originally found in Switzerland, it was described as a new species in 1984 by mycologists Alix David and Jean Keller. It has also been reported from North America.

References

Fungi described in 1984
Fungi of Europe
Fungi of North America
lilacina